Schindleria pietschmanni is a species of fish which was classified in the family Schindleriidae found in the Taiwan Strait.

References

Schindleriidae
Gobiidae
Fish described in 2004